Sancho Jani (born 12 August 1974) is an Austrian former footballer who played as a forward.

External links
 

1974 births
Living people
Austrian footballers
TSV Hartberg players
SW Bregenz players
First Vienna FC players
DSV Leoben players
Wiener Sport-Club players
Association football forwards